Denis Masséglia (born 11 April 1981) is a French politician of La République En Marche! (LREM) who has been serving as a member of the French National Assembly since the 2017 elections, representing the department of Maine-et-Loire.

Political career
In parliament, Masséglia serves as member of the Committee on Foreign Affairs. In addition to his committee assignments, he is part of the parliamentary friendship groups with the United States, Japan and South Korea.

In 2017, Masséglia launched a parliamentary study group on video games.

Political positions
In July 2019, Masséglia voted in favor of the French ratification of the European Union’s Comprehensive Economic and Trade Agreement (CETA) with Canada.

See also
 2017 French legislative election

References

1981 births
Living people
Deputies of the 15th National Assembly of the French Fifth Republic
La République En Marche! politicians
People from Nice
French people of Italian descent
Deputies of the 16th National Assembly of the French Fifth Republic